Steve Gorn (born 1947 in New York City) is a bamboo flautist and saxophone player.

Gorn has performed Indian classical music, jazz and new American music on the bansuri bamboo flute and soprano saxophone in concerts and festivals throughout the world. A disciple of the late bansuri master, Sri Gour Goswami of Calcutta,  as one of the few westerners recognized to have captured the subtlety and beauty of Indian music. He also has composed numerous works for theatre, dance and television and has recorded and performed with a wide range of artists including Paul Simon, Tony Levin, Jack DeJohnette, Glen Velez, Karl Berger, Alessandra Belloni, Layne Redmond, Simon Shaheen and Mick Karn.

Discography 
 Asian Journal (Music of the World, 1979)
 Bansuri Bamboo Flute (Music of the World, 1980, 1982)
 Yantra: Flute and Tabla with Badal Roy (Music of the World, 1983)
 Luminous Ragas with Marc Levinson, 1991
 Steel & Bamboo with Robert Dick, 1993
 From the Caves of the Iron Mountain with Tony Levin, Jerry Marotta, 1997
 Wings and Shadows with Warren Senders
 Pampara: In Memory of Gour Goswami with Annalisa Adami, Samir Chatterjee, 1996
 Pranam with Samir Chatterjee, Barun Kumar Pal, David Taylor, 1999
 The Green Bird, Elliot Goldenthal musical in which he performed, 2000
 2000 live with Bill Buchen, Hallie Laxmi, 2000
 Drala with Anandi, Bill Buchen, Amitava Chatterjee, Randy Crafton, Mark Egan, Cyndi Lee, David Nichtern 2001
 Colors of the Mind with Kevin Bents, David Marino, Barun Kumar Pal, Falguni Shah, Stomu Takeishi, Gordon Titcomb, 2002
 Midnight Flower with Keven Bents, Ty Burhoe, Clifford Carter, Mark Egan, Jamey Haddad, Matt Kilmer, Falguni Shah, Shane Shanahan, 2003
 Dreaming Mexico with Georg Hofmann, Raul Tudon, 2004
 Priyagitah: The Nightingale with David Michael, Michael Stirling, Benjy Wertheimer, 2004
 Meditate with Pamela Miles, 2007
 Rasika with Samir Chatterjee, Hallie Laxmi, 2007
 Song of the Swan with Natraj, 2008
 Luminosity with Len & Vani Greene, 2011
 So Beautiful or So What with Paul Simon, 2011

References

External links
Steve Gorn official site
"Steve Gorn" by Kavita Chhibber
Podcast featuring Steve Gorn originally broadcast on WKCR 89.9 FM-NY

American flautists
American jazz soprano saxophonists
American male saxophonists
Bansuri players
Hindustani instrumentalists
Living people
Musicians from New York City
Jazz musicians from New York (state)
21st-century American saxophonists
21st-century American male musicians
American male jazz musicians
1987 births
20th-century American saxophonists
20th-century American male musicians
20th-century flautists
21st-century flautists